Yoruba architecture is an architectural style produced by the Yoruba people of West Africa, dating back to approximately the 8th century. and lasted up to and beyond the colonial period beginning in the 19th century CE. 

Typical houses consisted of rectangular windowless single-room buildings arranged around a central courtyard ringed by verandas. Building styles resembled those of the Ashanti, including construction from earth, wood, palm oil and straw bolstered by timber frameworks and roofed with thatched leaves and wood, or later aluminum and corrugated iron.

After British colonization, architecture in Lagos in particular was influenced by Brazilian architecture, which introduced elements such as masonry, stucco, arched windows and doorways, and multi-storey buildings.

Most medieval Yoruba settlements were surrounded by defensive mud walls. Sungbo's Eredo, a series of such fortifications equipped with guard houses and moats, has been considered the largest pre-colonial monument in Africa, larger even than the Great Pyramid in Egypt or Great Zimbabwe.

History

Pre-colonial styles

Pre-colonial Yoruba people predominantly lived in ring-like urban clusters. Families lived in square structures built to enclose open courtyards, and the palaces of obas often had an open market area that made up the centre of a town. A hierarchy of sorts was maintained throughout many Yoruba towns, wherein the oba or other ruler boasted the largest compound and the most courtyards. The dwelling places of the city's ward or lineage chiefs were following in size and space, which were also typically made with more than one central courtyard. The sizes of the houses of the town elders of local families followed suit.

Traditional Yoruba architectural forms can be seen as hollow squares or circles, and buildings can be viewed as compounds consisting of various sub-units arranged in quadrilateral shapes surrounding an open courtyard. The open space served as the point of social contact for inhabitants and was also used for cooking and craft making. The open spaces or courtyards were purposefully designed to be much larger than interior spaces to encourage communication between family members. On the other hand, the enclosed spaces made much smaller and darker were mostly used for sleeping. The main material for building house walls was molded mud, obtained from laterite soils. Yoruba houses were built without windows. Roofing materials were influenced by environmental conditions. In areas closest to the Atlantic coast, raffia palm leaves were frequently used for roofing, while in the northern regions, wood was substituted for palm fronds.

The palaces and houses of chiefs had extended courtyards. Animal murals and carved posts beautified palaces and chiefly homes, which also served as prominent shrines for dedications to Orishas. Gardens were prominent in Yoruba arts and architecture. Yoruba palaces often included gardens. At the Olowo's palace for example, there existed different kinds of gardens ranging from farm, temple, sacred, kitchen, and herb gardens. Impluviums were also utilized in Yoruba compounds to collect rain water.

Brazilian styles 

Following the British conquest of Lagos, the town grew into a city with a varied population. This population consisted of the indigenous residents of Isale Eko (Lagos Island), Yoruba returnees from Brazil, Trinidad and Cuba, who had crossed the Atlantic twice, European merchants and British colonists, and mixed-race Creoles. Many African returnees from Brazil had trained in masonry, and they introduced stuccoed bungalows and multi-storey buildings with arched windows and doorways, influenced by Brazilian architecture. This style began to dominate colonial Lagos, especially in Olowogbowo, Popo Aguda, Ebute Metta and Yaba. Apprentices trained by the returnees later spread a modified variant across the region. These Brazilian style-houses were built with open spaces for ventilation between the tops of the walls and the roofs and verandahs on the front of back entrances. Two-story sobrados, quadrangular with central areas that could hold alcoves, chapels and staircases with accompanying passageways, became popular. A Sardinian established a brick and tile factory in Lagos, leading to affordable storey houses made from brick. The brick columns and walls were plastered with ornamentation, and further embellishments were incorporated into plinths, columns, shafts and bases.

Stately houses were built and reproduced in different shapes and sizes by the Yoruba returnees from the New World into the city of Lagos. Examples include: the residence of Andrew Thomas, a two-story Brazilian-styled house designed with ornate works of plaster; Joaquim Devonde Branco's brickhouse, with wrought-iron windows; and the Caxton House on Marina, which was built with a two-story main building, two showrooms at each side of the main building, horse stables, and a garden.

References